Joan Rosier-Jones (born 27 December 1940 in Christchurch) is a New Zealand novelist, playwright, short story writer and nonfiction writer, and teacher. She completed a Teacher's- A Certificate in Christchurch Teachers' College in 1958–59 and a Bachelor of Arts majoring in history and English.

Career and family life

Rosier-Jones has been a primary teacher and later taught creative writing to adults. She has written writing courses for the New Zealand Institute of Business Studies and supported up-and-coming New Zealand writers. Rosier-Jones was president of New Zealand Society of Authors (PEN New Zealand Inc.), the New Zealand writers' "union" and NZ PEN, from 1999–2001. She has lived in London, Wellington, and Auckland for 30 years and currently resides with her husband Fergus in Whanganui, a river city in the North Island of New Zealand. She has one son and one daughter. A passionate advocate of New Zealand writing she has published several how to do books about writing.  She has also contributed articles to "Metro," "Next" and "New Zealand Author."

Novels

In 1985, Rosier-Jones published her first novel, Cast two Shadows. The novel is set during the 1978 Bastion Point land protest.
In 1986, she was awarded a Literary Fund's Writers' Bursary $10,000, which allowed her to work full-time on her second novel  Voyagers. New Zealand writer Fiona Kidman described it as a novel "marked by prodigious and impressive research ... immensely satisfying and thought-provoking." 1990, she published Canterbury Tales, which looks into the lives of a group of travellers on a South Island train. "The allegory of Chaucer's masterpiece is obvious but that does not detract from this book being an entertaining and well constructed read-indeed it probably adds to it.( Daily Telegraph), Her third novel Mother Tongue (1996) is set in an imagined future where a Maori dictatorship is ruling New Zealand.
Crossing the Alps ( 2012) the protagonist Hannah Francis, born of an American father and New Zealand-Irish mother, has been brought up in New York by her father and grandmother. Now an adult, she is on her way back to New Zealand to enter a rehab centre to deal with her alcoholism. 
Waiting for Elizabeth (2013) is set in Ireland 1565. It features 'Old English' Thomas Butler, Earl of Ormond, is waiting for his Queen, Elizabeth and is a story, of romance and political intrigue.

Play

In the mid eighties Rosier-Jones wrote a play "The Stars go Down" which was performed at Auckland University's The Kenneth Maidment Theatre, Wanganui Repertory Company and off-Broadway in New York.

Non-fiction

In The Murder of Chow Yat, 2009 Market Gardener, Chow Yat, who lived on the outskirts of Wanganui in post-WWI New Zealand. On 31 May 1922 this Chinese market-garden worker was shot four times."Joan Rosier-Jones ... creates a vivid picture with detailed and insightful chapters addressing 1920s Wanganui, Chow Yat’s early life, incidents on the day, evening of, and day after the murder, the police investigation, suspects, aftermath, and ongoing uncertainty. Her sparse writing style allows space to absorb, ponder and speculate – not only in terms of the whodunnit aspect, but also wider issues such as historic xenophobia, faulty eye-witness descriptions, family secrets, and the police tendency to focus on building a case against one suspect to the detriment of other options... "

Writing your family History (1997 updated 2005) contains information on the subject of researching and writing your family history. "... is a practical, sensible and explicit "how-to" book for New Zealanders ..." So you want to Write (2000) shares Joan Rosier-Jones knowledge and depth of experience in the act of writing. Based on her successful creative writing teaching, the book covers a wide range of subjects.

List of books
 Cast two Shadows, 1985, Hodder & Stoughton Auckland 
 Voyagers, 1987, Hodder & Stoughton, Auckland. 	
 Canterbury Tales, 1990, Hodder & Stoughton  
 Mother Tongue, 1996, David Ling Publishing, Auckland  
 Writing Your Family History, 1997, Tandem Press, Auckland 
 So You Want to Write, 2000, Tandem Press, Auckland 
 Yes, 2000, David Ling Publishing 
 New Zealand Children's Literature (with Annie Shih, joint Mandarin & English collection of pieces written for the Mandarin Daily) 2003, Shanghai, 
 The Murder of Chow Yat, 2009, Stead & Daughters, Wanganui 
 Crossing the Alps, 2012, Bluewood Publishing, Christchurch 
 Waiting For Elizabeth, 2013, Tangerine Publications, Wanganui 
 Sunset at the Estuary, 2015, ed. with Dorothy Alexander, Rangitawa, Feilding

References

1940 births
Living people
New Zealand women dramatists and playwrights
20th-century New Zealand novelists
21st-century New Zealand novelists
21st-century New Zealand women writers
20th-century New Zealand women writers
New Zealand women novelists
20th-century New Zealand dramatists and playwrights
21st-century New Zealand dramatists and playwrights